Gubernatorial Election in Ryazan Oblast were held on 10 September 2017.

Background
14 February 2017 the Governor Oleg Kovalyov announced early resignation and that he will not nominate his candidacy for a new term. Acting Governor was appointed Nikolay Lyubimov.

Candidates
Candidates on the ballot:

Opinion polls

Result

See also
2017 Russian gubernatorial elections

References

2017 elections in Russia
2017 Russian gubernatorial elections
Politics of Ryazan Oblast